The Chairman of the Supreme Soviet of the Latvian Soviet Socialist Republic was the presiding officer of that legislature. It is not to be confused with the Chairman of the Presidium of the Latvian Soviet Socialist Republic, a superior position in the Soviet state apparatus.

Chairman of the Supreme Council of (from May 4, 1990) the Republic of Latvia

Sources

Politics of Latvia
Lists of legislative speakers in the Soviet Union
Latvian SSR
Lists of political office-holders in Latvia
List
List